Laura Sedgwick Collins (1859–1927) was an American musician, composer and actress. Laura Sedgwick was born in Poughkeepsie, New York. She graduated from the Lyceum School of Acting in New York City and performed in theaters in New York and Brooklyn. She played the piano and wrote music, including "The Two Republics" a march performed at the unveiling of the Statue of Liberty. She belonged to the Music Teachers' National Association.

Works
Collins wrote mostly theater music, but also songs and violin pieces. Selected works include:

The Two Republics
Pierrot, music for the play
Electra, music for the play (1889)
Thou'rt like a lovely Flower {Du bist wie eine Blume} part-song for men's voices, words by H. Heine (1900)
The Night-Watch, part-song for men's voices, words and music by L. S. Collins (1900)
Love is a Sickness, part-song, words by S. Daniel (1900)
The Origin of the Rainbow (1908)
My Philosophy, song, words and music by L. S. Collins (1911)
Sleepy Time, song, words by A. Fitch (1913)
Tree of Light!, a community carol, words and music by L. S. Collins  (1916)
Everybody's Christmas! and It's your Christmas and mine! words by Louise Horton, two community carols for mixed voices with piano or organ accompaniment (1917)
In memoriam: A tribute to Theodore Roosevelt, (1919)

References

1859 births
1927 deaths
19th-century American actresses
19th-century American composers
19th-century classical composers
20th-century American actresses
20th-century classical composers
Actresses from New York (state)
American women classical composers
American classical composers
American music educators
American women music educators
American Romantic composers
American stage actresses
Musicians from Poughkeepsie, New York
20th-century American women musicians
20th-century American composers
Educators from New York (state)
Classical musicians from New York (state)
Wikipedia articles incorporating text from A Woman of the Century
20th-century women composers
19th-century women composers
19th-century American women musicians